Rosielis Coromoto Quintana Mendoza (born 2000) is a Venezuelan weightlifter. She is a two-time medalist at the Pan American Weightlifting Championships. She is also a two-time silver medalist at the Bolivarian Games.

Career 

She competed in the women's 45kg event at the 2019 World Weightlifting Championships in Pattaya, Thailand.

She won the silver medal in the women's 45kg event at the 2021 Pan American Weightlifting Championships held in Guayaquil, Ecuador. She competed in the women's 45kg event at the 2021 World Weightlifting Championships held in Tashkent, Uzbekistan.

She won two silver medals at the 2022 Bolivarian Games held in Valledupar, Colombia. She won the bronze medal in her event at the 2022 Pan American Weightlifting Championships held in Bogotá, Colombia. She competed in the women's 45kg event at the 2022 World Weightlifting Championships in Bogotá, Colombia.

Achievements

Notes

References

External links 
 

Living people
2000 births
Place of birth missing (living people)
Venezuelan female weightlifters
Pan American Weightlifting Championships medalists
21st-century Venezuelan women